Doris Emmie Grimes (1 January 1909 – 27 June 1987) was a British diver. She competed in the women's 10 metre platform event at the 1928 Summer Olympics.

References

External links
 

1909 births
1987 deaths
British female divers
Olympic divers of Great Britain
Divers at the 1928 Summer Olympics
People from Wandsworth